East Point's Greatest Hit is an album by the Dungeon Family member Cool Breeze, released in 1999. Its most successful track was the hit single "Watch for the Hook," featuring various members of the Dungeon Family.

The album peaked at No. 38 on the Billboard 200.

Critical reception
Spin lamented that the beats were "more about lowriding funk than ... futuristic Southern bounce."

Track listing
 Ghet To Camelot  
 Watch For The Hook (Dungeon Family Mix) ft. Goodie Mob, OutKast & Witchdoctor
 Good Good    
 Pop, Pop, Pop (Interlude)
 Cre-A-Tine  
 We Get It Crunk ft. Kurupt
 College Parkay (Interlude)
 Butta  
 Hit Man ft. Witchdoctor & Backbone
 Black Gangster   
 Big Rube  
 The Field ft. Nivea
 E.P.G.H.  
 Tenn Points ft. 8Ball
 Weeastpointin' ft. Sleepy Brown  
 Doin' It In The South  
 The Calhouns ft. Lucky, Pauly & Brian

All tracks produced by Organized Noize Productions
except "Black Gangster" produced by 2 Cold Capone, "E.P.G.H." produced by Mr. DJ, "Doin It In The South" produced by Skinny Miracles from Augusta, GA

References

1999 albums
Dungeon Family albums
Albums produced by Organized Noize